, originally , is a professional wrestling faction, performing in New Japan Pro-Wrestling (NJPW) and RevPro. The faction is led by Will Ospreay.

The group was formed in October 2020 by Ospreay and Great-O-Khan, when Ospreay turned on his Chaos stablemate Kazuchika Okada during the G1 Climax. Fellow NJPW wrestlers Jeff Cobb and Aaron Henare would join, as well as freelancers T. J. Perkins and Francesco Akira, and the team of Kyle Fletcher & Mark Davis known as Aussie Open, and "Lord" Gideon Grey from RevPro. O-Khan is the current Undisputed British Heavyweight Champion in his first reign, and TJP & Akira are the current IWGP Junior Heavyweight Tag Team Champions in their first reign as a team and individually.

Concept
The formation's concept is based on the multitude of its members whereabout countries and cultures. So far, the stable has had members from seven different countries. Kyle Fletcher and Mark Davis from Australia, Jeff Cobb and T. J. Perkins from the United States, Will Ospreay, Gideon Grey and Bea Priestley from England, Aaron Henare from New Zealand, Great-O-Khan from Japan and finally Francesco Akira from Italy.

History

Formation (2020) 
On night 17 of G1 Climax 30, during a match between Chaos members Kazuchika Okada and Will Ospreay, Bea Priestley, Ospreay's girlfriend, made her debut appearance in NJPW, at ringside. As Okada locked his Money Clip submission onto Ospreay, Priestley attempted to enter the ring, distracting the referee in the process. Tomoyuki Oka (now known as Great O-Khan) then made his surprise return from excursion and entered the ring behind the referee's back, attacking Okada with an iron claw slam, which allowed Ospreay to hit his Storm Breaker finisher, earning him the pinfall victory. After the match, Ospreay turned heel on Okada by attacking him with his Hidden Blade elbow strike to the back of his head. Later, in a backstage interview, Ospreay announced that he would officially leave Chaos to start a new faction with him, Priestley, and O-Khan called The Empire. O-Kharn later changed the spelling of his name to Great O-Khan, in reference to Genghis Khan of the Mongol Empire. Jeff Cobb joined the stable on November 15 when he was revealed to be O-Khan's mystery tag team partner for the annual World Tag League tournament. The duo would score 10 points (5 wins & 4 losses), not making the final, but getting a win over tournament finalists (and the previous year's winners), FinJuice (Juice Robinson & David Finlay).

United Empire (2021–present) 

At Wrestle Kingdom 15, O-Khan, Cobb, and Ospreay lost their matches to Hiroshi Tanahashi, Shingo Takagi (for the NEVER Openweight Championship), and Kazuchika Okada, respectively. At New Year Dash!! on January 6, The Empire defeated Tencozy (Hiroyoshi Tenzan & Satoshi Kojima) & Yota Tsuji when O-Khan & Cobb held Tsuji up for a Super OsCutter. After beating down O-Khan's trainer, Tenzan to the point where he had to be stretchered out, Ospreay declared that they would be renamed the United Empire. This change was later reflected on New Japan's websites, along with the group's first logo. After attempting to defend his tag partner from the Empire's attack, Kojima was scheduled to face Ospreay one-on-one at The New Beginning in Nagoya on January 30. O-Khan was also scheduled to face Tenzan one-on-one. All four men squared off a week beforehand in Tenzan's comeback from injury match in Ota City General Gymnasium on January 23, a match won by Ospreay and O-Khan. On January 26, new stipulations were added to the Ospreay vs. Kojima and O-Khan vs. Tenzan matches for The New Beginning in Nagoya. The loser of O-Khan vs. Tenzan is forced to retire their Mongolian Chop, while the Ospreay vs. Kojima match will be contested under no-disqualification rules. O-Khan and Ospreay went on to win their respective matches.

At Castle Attack, United Empire beat the team of Hiroshi Tanahashi and Tencozy on night one, but were unable to win their matches on night two. Ospreay and Cobb lost to Tencozy, while O-Khan failed to capture the NEVER Openweight Championship from Tanahashi. In March, Ospreay won the 2021 New Japan Cup after defeating Shingo Takagi. After the match, Ospreay hit a Os-Cutter on Bea Priestley, kicking her out of the United Empire and saying that he was "only looking out for number one" from now on. Toa Henare, now going by the ring name Aaron Henare, would become the fourth man to join the faction at Sakura Genesis 2021. On the same show Ospreay would defeat Kota Ibushi to win the IWGP World Heavyweight Championship. At Wrestling Dontaku, Ospreay made his first defense of the title when he defeated Shingo Takagi. However, Ospreay would later vacate the title after sustaining a neck injury. He would make his return at NJPW Resurgence, claiming to be the "real world champion", and announcing to not be returning to Japan for that years G1 Climax. In September at the Revolution Pro Wrestling High Stakes event, Ospreay recruited Aussie Open (Mark Davis and Kyle Fletcher) to the group. The following month during NJPW Strong's Autumn Attack, T. J. Perkins betrayed the LA Dojo and joined United Empire as their first Junior Heavyweight member.

Despite Ospreay's absence, both O'Khan and Cobb would enter the tournament in the A and B block respectively. O'Khan would finish in the bottom half of his block, scoring just 8 points, however, Cobb would break records in his block, going undefeated for 8 straight wins, before losing on the final deciders to Kazuchika Okada on Day 18, whom he had traded back and forth wins with over the second half of the year.

At Wrestle Kingdom 16, Ospreay being the previous champion and not directly losing his title, would get a shot at the IWGP World Heavyweight Championship against the winner of Shingo Takagi and Kazuchika Okada on night two, where he would lose to Okada. Both O-Khan and Cobb would also lose their respective matches to Sanada and Tetsuya Naito, respectively. United Empire would take part in the New Japan Cup, where Ospreay, O-Khan, Cobb and Aaron Henare would proceed to the second round with wins over Bushi, Kota Ibushi, Togi Makabe and Yuto Nakanishima, respectively. Ibushi was injured at the time and O-Khan would win by forfeit. Ospreay, O-Khan and Cobb would move to the third round with wins over El Phantasmo, Taiji Ishimori and Kosei Fujita, respectively. Henare was eliminated after losing to Sanada. Ospreay and Cobb would qualify for the quarter finals with wins over Yoshi-Hashi and Sanada, respectively while O-Khan would lose to Zack Sabre Jr. Both Ospreay and Cobb were eliminated in the semi-final after losing to Tetsuya Naito and Zack Sabre Jr., respectively. After the New Japan Cup, Ospreay would start scouting the Junior Heavyweight division and at Hyper Battle he would recruit Fracisco Akira as the newest member.

On the May 25th episode of AEW Dynamite, Cobb and O'Khan interrupted the ROH World Tag Team Championship match between, FTR and Roppongi Vice causing a disqualification by attacking both teams, with Cobb returning to All Elite Wrestling for the first time since 2019 and O'Khan making his debut. They raised the titles, indicating the intention of challenging for the championships. The stable returned two weeks later, on the June 8th episode of Dynamite, this time with Ospreay, Henare, Fletcher and Davis making their AEW debuts, attacking Trent Beretta and FTR. Ospreay competed in his first singles match at the June 15th special episode of Dynamite, Road Rager, where he defeated Dax Harwood. After the match Ospreay and United Empire stablemates attacked FTR and Roppongi Vice once more, only to be interrupted by Orange Cassidy, who stared down Ospreay. Soon after a singles match between both men was scheduled for AEW×NJPW: Forbidden Door, for Ospreay's newly won IWGP United States Heavyweight Championship, along with a triple-threat tag-team match, between FTR, Roppongi Vice and O-Khan and Cobb, for the ROH World Tag Team Championships and O-Khan and Cobb's newly won IWGP Tag Team Championships. At the event, Cobb and O-Khan lost the IWGP Heavyweight Tag Team Championships to FTR, yet Will Ospreay retained his IWGP United States Championship against Orange Cassidy. After the match Aussie Open and Ospreay continued to attack Cassidy and Roppongi Vice, however were interrupted by Katsuyori Shibata, who saved Cassidy from the trio.

On the June 19th edition of NJPW Strong Ignition, Aussie Open competed in a tournament to crown the inaugural Strong Openweight Tag Team Championship. In the first round, they defeated The Dark Order's Evil Uno and Alan Angels and they defeated the Stray Dog Army in the semi-finals. In the finals at Strong: High Alert, Davis and Fletcher defeated Christopher Daniels and Yuya Uemura to become the inaugural champions.

On July 27, the AEW World Trios Championship was revealed, with Ospreay and Aussie Open being named as participants in the inaugural tournament. On August 24, Ospreay and Aussie Open defeated Death Triangle to progress to the semifinals, where they were defeated by The Elite on August 31. After the match, United Empire attacked The Elite.

United Empire made their Impact Wrestling debut on the September 8th edition of Impact!, when Aussie Open, defeated Bullet Club's Chris Bey and Ace Austin.

Members

Current

Former

Sub-groups

Current
{|class="wikitable sortable" style="text-align:center;"
|-
!Affiliate
!Members
!Tenure
!Type
|-
|Aussie Open
|Kyle FletcherMark Davis
|2021–present
|Tag team
|-
|Great-O-Khan & Jeff Cobb
|Great-O-KhanJeff Cobb
|2020–present
|Tag team
|-
|The Swords of Essence
|Will OspreayT. J. Perkins
|2021–present
|Tag team
|-
|Catch 2/2
|Francesco AkiraT. J. Perkins
|2022–present
|Tag team
|-
|O-Khan and Henare||Great-O-KhanAaron Henare||2023–present||Tag team
|-

Timeline

Championships and accomplishments
New Japan Pro-Wrestling
IWGP World Heavyweight Championship (1 time) – Ospreay
IWGP United States Heavyweight Championship (1 time) – Ospreay
IWGP Tag Team Championship (2 times) – O-Khan & Cobb
IWGP Junior Heavyweight Tag Team Championship (1 time, current) – TJP & Akira
New Japan Cup (2021) – Ospreay
Strong Openweight Tag Team Championship (1 time) – Aussie Open (Kyle Fletcher & Mark Davis) 
Inaugural Strong Openweight Tag Team Championship Tournament – Aussie Open (Kyle Fletcher & Mark Davis)

Pro Wrestling Illustrated
Singles wrestlers
Ranked Ospreay No. 7 of the top 500 singles wrestlers in the PWI 500 of 2021
Ranked TJP No. 91 of the top 500 singles wrestlers in the PWI 500 of 2021
Ranked Cobb No. 139 of the top 500 singles wrestlers in the PWI 500 of 2021
Ranked O-Khan No. 157 of the top 500 singles wrestlers in the PWI 500 of 2021
Ranked Akira No. 264 of the top 500 singles wrestlers in the PWI 500 of 2022
Tag teams
Ranked Aussie Open (Kyle Fletcher & Mark Davis) No. 11 of the top 100 tag teams in the PWI Tag Team 100 of 2022
Ranked Great-O-Khan & Jeff Cobb No. 12 of the top 100 tag teams in the PWI Tag Team 100 of 2022
Ranked Catch 2/2 (TJP & Francesco Akira) No. 22 of the top 100 tag teams in the PWI Tag Team 100 of 2022

PWA Black Label
PWA Tag Team Championship (1 time) – Aussie Open (Kyle Fletcher & Mark Davis)

Revolution Pro Wrestling
British Heavyweight Championship (2 times) – Ospreay (1) and O-Khan (1, current)
British Tag Team Championship (2 times) – O-Khan with Rampage Brown (1), Aussie Open (Kyle Fletcher & Mark Davis) (1)

Tokyo Sports
Best Bout Award (2022) – Ospreay vs. Kazuchika Okada on August 18
Technique Award (2021) – O-Khan
Fighting Spirit Award (2022) – O-Khan
Best Tag Team Award (2022) – O-Khan & Cobb

Warriors of Wrestling
Warrior Wrestling Championship (1 time ) – Ospreay

World Wonder Ring Stardom
SWA World Championship (1 time) – Priestley

References

External links
United Empire Profile at Cagematch.net

All Elite Wrestling teams and stables
New Japan Pro-Wrestling teams and stables
Independent promotions teams and stables